The Pan Pacific Open, currently sponsored by Toray Industries, is a women's outdoor hardcourt tennis tournament held annually in Tokyo, Japan. It is a WTA 500-level tournament.

History
The tournament was first held in 1973 as the Toray Sillook Championships, In 1976 the name was changed to the Sillook Open in Tokyo. In 1982 it was renamed the  TV Championships and in 1983 it changed yet again to the Queens Grand Prix. Its current name, the Pan Pacific Open, was designated in 1984 and had traditionally been played on indoor carpet at the Tokyo Metropolitan Gymnasium.  In 2008 the event moved to outdoor hard courts at the Ariake Coliseum. It was classified as a Tier I tournament from 1993 through 2008. Then, it became a Premier 5 tournament in 2009 until it was downgraded to a Premier event from the 2014 edition onwards, with the Wuhan Open in Wuhan, China acting as its replacement in the Premier category.

Martina Hingis holds the record for most singles titles with five.

Past finals

Singles

Doubles

See also
 Japan Open
 Japan Women's Open

References

External links

Official tournament website

 
Tennis tournaments in Japan
Hard court tennis tournaments
WTA Tour
Recurring sporting events established in 1984
Sports competitions in Tokyo
1984 establishments in Japan